Events in the year 1970 in Spain.

Incumbents
Caudillo: Francisco Franco

Establishments

AgD Ceuta
Alcobendas CF
CD Cieza
CD Baza
CD Roquetas
Jaque—magazine
RSD Santa Isabel

Events
 28 December: Burgos trials: Three Basques are sentenced to death, twelve others sentenced to imprisonment (terms from 12 to 62 years), and one is released.

Date unknown
National Union of Credit Cooperatives is founded.

Births

 1 January: Joan Francesc Ferrer Sicilia.
 28 June: Manolo Herrero.
 5 July: Valentí Massana.

Deaths

 11 July: Agustín Muñoz Grandes.

See also
 List of Spanish films of 1970

References

 
Spain
Spain
1970s in Spain
Years of the 20th century in Spain